The shy cosmet moth (Limnaecia phragmitella) is a moth of the family Cosmopterigidae. It is known from all of Europe, as well as Asia, Australia and New Zealand. It is also present in North America, where it is distributed from Nova Scotia to Virginia, west to Oklahoma and north to Ontario. The habitat consists of fens and marshes.

Adults are on wing in July in western Europe  and from June to August in North America. Adults have shiny yellowish-tan forewings with two white-ringed dark brown dots and some dark brown shading near the apex. The hindwing is tan shaded with gray.

The larvae feed inside the seedheads of Typha species, including Typha angustifolia and Typha latifolia. There are indications that young larvae mine in the spongy tissue of the leaf sheaths. The larvae have a whitish or pale tan body with a brown dorsal line. The dorsolateral and ventrolateral lines are composed of light brown irregular patches. The head is brown with darker brown spots and there are brown spots on the terminal abdominal segment.

References

Limnaecia
Moths of Europe
Moths of New Zealand
Moths described in 1851
Moths of Asia
Moths of North America
Moths of Australia
Taxa named by Henry Tibbats Stainton